The Kazakh national bandy team has been representing Kazakhstan in the Bandy World Championships since 1995. Kazakhstan finished third in 2003, 2005, 2012, 2013, 2014 and 2015. In 2011 and 2012 they lost the semifinals after extra-time.

Kazakhstan won the 2011 Asian Winter Games.

The participation in the rink bandy tournament of the first CIS festival for national sports and games in 2017, Фестиваль национальных видов спорта и игр государств — участников Содружества Независимых Государств, resulted in third place.

World Championship record

Current squad 
Kazakh squad at the 2019 World Championship in Vänersborg, Sweden.

External links
Video: The whole third place match in WCS 2014
Video: The whole third place match in WCS 2015

References 

National bandy teams
Bandy
Bandy in Kazakhstan